Hossein Afarideh is an Iranian physicist and member of parliament.

Afarideh was born in Shirvan, Iran in 1954. He studied the school period in Shirvan and was accepted in Tehran University in Physics field. He passed the exams with high mark and got the first grade. He was accepted by Birmingham University. He got his Ph.D in 1988. He was Shirvan's representative in 6th and 7th period. He was a member of the Energy Committee in Iran's Parliament. now he is a faculty member of Amirkabir university and is Head of Department of Energy Engineering and Physics Prof. at Amirkabir University of Technology.

References 

Living people
1954 births
People from Şirvan, Azerbaijan
University of Tehran alumni
Alumni of the University of Birmingham
Academic staff of Amirkabir University of Technology
Members of the 6th Islamic Consultative Assembly
Members of the 7th Islamic Consultative Assembly